Vicky Vette (born 12 June 1965) is a Norwegian-Canadian pornographic actress, webcam model and webmaster. She has been named the most-followed Norwegian on Twitter by the newspaper Verdens Gang. She also shot a mainstream movie in Indonesia called Pacar Hantu Perawan.

Early life
Vette was born in Stavanger, Norway, and moved to Canada when she was almost five years old. She relocated to the United States as an adult. She is mostly Norwegian with some German ancestry from her father. Her first jobs were as a janitor at a church and as a nurse's aide at a retirement home. She attended Alcoholics Anonymous at age 21 and has been sober ever since.

According to Vette, she was an accountant and a housing contractor with her husband prior to her career in adult films.

Career
In October 2002, Vette submitted a photo of herself for the Hustler Beaver Hunt contest and won. Her first scene, in which she performed double penetration, was with Dick Delaware and Alex Roxx in Joey Silvera's Evil Vault for Evil Angel. The scene was shot on 31 May 2003, less than two weeks before her 38th birthday. She stopped shooting for other studios during the summer of 2006 and has shot exclusively for her own website ever since.

Vette has a line of adult toys called the 'Vicky Quickie' released worldwide by Doc Johnson. She runs a network of adult websites called the VNA Network  with stars such as Nikki Benz, Puma Swede, and Julia Ann. VNA stands for Vette Nation Army, the nickname of her fan community.

Personal life
On 29 January 2006, Vette announced that she was separating from her husband, Frank, citing 18 years of physical and mental abuse as the reason. The following day, it was reported that Frank had been found dead in a friend's home, where he was staying, and that police ruled his death a suicide. The couple had been swingers for over 15 years and performed together in videos and webcam shows for Vette's website. They also lived in a naturist community outside of Atlanta, Georgia.

Awards

References

External links

 
 
 
 

1965 births
Living people
Norwegian emigrants to Canada
Norwegian expatriates in the United States
Norwegian people of German descent
Norwegian pornographic film actresses
Actors from Stavanger
Webcam models